Zilka Nazareth de Carvalho (31 May 1917 – 10 March 2005) was a Brazilian actress who appeared in a variety of telenovelas. She was born and died in Rio de Janeiro, She also portraying the character Dona Benta from the series Sítio do Picapau Amarelo.

Filmography

Cinema

Television

External links 

1917 births
2005 deaths
Actresses from Rio de Janeiro (city)
Brazilian telenovela actresses